Pieter van Coninxloo (c. 1460–1513) was an Early Netherlandish painter first documented as active in Brussels from 1479. Little is known of his life apart from his appearance in records of 1479, 1503 and 1513, in the archives of Margaret of Austria when he is mentioned in relation to the commission of portraits. He came from a family of artists; at least six generations were painters. His brother was Jan van Coninxloo.

Van Coninxloo specialised in portraiture, and worked at different times for the Burgundian court. He is thought to have painted a  portrait, now in the Royal Collection at Windsor Castle, of Margaret of Austria commissioned by Philip the Good with the intention of sending it to Henry VII of England. He was employed in 1513 to paint portraits of the future Charles V and his sisters. Max Friedländer believes he may have been one of the most significant of the Brussels school painters before Bernard van Orley. However only a handful of his works have survived, and even these are tentatively attributed.

He is sometimes associated with the unidentified artist known as the Master of the Legend of the Magdalen (Meister der Magdalenenlegende), thought to have been a court painter to Margaret of Austria, and who shares similarities of style, time and location. A number of art historians, including Max Friedländer, who first identified the Master of the Legend of the Magdalen, speculated that they may have been the same person. He may also have been a member of the master's workshop.

Notes

Sources
Campbell, Lorne. The Fifteenth Century Netherlandish Schools. London: National Gallery Publications, 1998. 

1460s births
1513 deaths
Early Netherlandish painters